The Dietzenley in the county of Vulkaneifel in the German state of Rhineland-Palatinate is a mountain, and the highest point in the Pelm Forest, a part of the Volcanic Eifel range.

The Dietzenley rises within the Volcanic Eifel Nature Park in the parish of Gerolstein north and above the Gerolstein quarter of Büscheich-Niedereich.

On the largely wooded domed summit stands a small, wooden observation tower, which offers a good view of the Volcanic Eifel. Somewhat below it there is an electrical converter and the remains of a Celtic ringwall.

The Dietzenley may be reached on footpaths from Gerolstein, Pelm or Gees.

References 

Mountains under 1000 metres
Mountains and hills of the Eifel
Mountains and hills of Rhineland-Palatinate
Natural monuments in Rhineland-Palatinate